Lucy Torres-Gomez (born Lucy Marie Martinez Torres; December 11, 1974), is a Filipina actress and politician. She has served as Mayor of Ormoc and as the Representative for Leyte's 4th legislative district from June 2013 to June 2022, and previously from June 2010 to March 2013. This district includes the city of Ormoc, and the municipalities of Albuera, Isabel, Kananga, Matag-ob, Merida, and Palompon.

She is married to fellow actor turned politician Richard Gomez, who currently serves as the mayor of Ormoc.

Early life and media career
Torres-Gomez was born on December 11, 1974, in Ormoc, Philippines to Manuel "Manoling" Torres Jr. and Julie Martinez, the second of four children. She has an older sister and two younger brothers. For primary and secondary school, she attended the Benedictine founded Saint Peter's College in Ormoc. Torres-Gomez later attended the University of the Philippines Cebu (then a college of the University of the Philippines Visayas), from which she earned a Bachelor of Science degree in business management.

In 1993, Torres-Gomez shot a TV commercial for Lux Shampoo at Lake Caliraya, Laguna, where she met her future husband, Richard Gomez. Five years later in 1998, the two starred in the ABS-CBN television sitcom Richard Loves Lucy, and married that same year. Torres-Gomez has also hosted the TV5 reality dance competition show Shall We Dance? and the Q lifestyle show The Sweet Life, and endorses Philippine brands bench/, and Kashieca.

Political career
Torres-Gomez was elected the Representative for Leyte's 4th legislative district as substitute candidate for her husband Richard Gomez on May 10, 2010. Gomez was disqualified by the Commission on Elections (COMELEC) due to his lack of one year residency in the district, a requirement of eligibility for office. On March 19, 2013, the Supreme Court, ruled on a protest filed by fellow congressional candidate Eufrocino Codilla Jr., ousting Torres-Gomez from office. The Courts said that she "did not validly substitute" her husband. Her ousting did not affect her re-election bid, and she regained her seat in May of that same year, beating incumbent Ormoc Mayor Eric Codilla. In May 2016, Torres-Gomez was again re-elected as representative, defeating Violeta Codilla.

As congresswoman, Torres-Gomez has principally authored over 100 bills and co-authored 35. She is the chairperson of the House Committee on Disaster Resilience, and the vice chairperson of committees on Tourism, and Women and Gender Equality, and the special committee on Creative Industry and Performing Arts.

At the height of the COVID-19 pandemic in June 2020, Torres-Gomez expressed her support for the controversial Anti-Terrorism Act of 2020, stating that fear of the abuse of law is not a valid reason to reject needed legislation. The bill was signed into law as Republic Act No. 11479 on July 3, 2020. The law's constitutionality is currently being challenged in the Supreme Court by multiple groups.

Torres-Gomez, together with husband Richard Gomez, was a member of the then-ruling Liberal Party during her early political career, but left in June 2016 to join the Partido Demokratiko Pilipino–Lakas ng Bayan (PDP–Laban) shortly after Rodrigo Duterte won the presidential election.

Personal life
Torres-Gomez married actor and Ormoc Mayor Richard Gomez on April 28, 1998 at the Saints Peter and Paul Parish Church in Ormoc, Leyte. They currently reside in Ormoc, and have one daughter, Juliana Marie Beatriz (b. 2000).

Torres-Gomez is Roman Catholic. She speaks Cebuano, English, and Tagalog.

In 2018, Torres-Gomez was named Most Stylish Woman by Philippine Tatler.

Filmography

Film

Television

References

External links

1974 births
Living people
Visayan people
Filipino television personalities
People from Ormoc
Actresses from Leyte (province)
Filipino people of German descent
Filipino people of Spanish descent
Filipino actor-politicians
Liberal Party (Philippines) politicians
Members of the House of Representatives of the Philippines from Leyte (province)
Women members of the House of Representatives of the Philippines
University of the Philippines Cebu alumni
The Philippine Star people
ABS-CBN personalities
GMA Network personalities
TV5 (Philippine TV network) personalities
Filipino politicians of Chinese descent